Buhovtsi (also transcribed as Bukhovtsi, Buhovtzi or Buhovci) is a village in northeastern Bulgaria, located in the Targovishte Municipality of the Targovishte Province.

References

Villages in Targovishte Province